Paul Hanley and Nathan Healey won in the final 7–6 (12–10), 6–2 against Irakli Labadze and Attila Sávolt.

Seeds
Champion seeds are indicated in bold text while text in italics indicates the round in which those seeds were eliminated.

 František Čermák /  Sander Groen (quarterfinals)
 Robbie Koenig /  Mark Merklein (semifinals)
 Tim Crichton /  Paul Rosner (first round)
 Paul Hanley /  Nathan Healey (champions)

Draw

External links
 2001 Idea Prokom Open Men's Doubles Draw

Men's Doubles
Doubles